Roberto Vitiello (born 8 May 1983) is an Italian footballer who plays as a right back.

Career
Vitiello started his career at Parma, in 2002, he participated in Torneo di Viareggio with Parma and highly rated. He then awarded no.34 of the first team.

After loaned to Cesena of Serie C1, he was loaned to Vicenza of Serie B in July 2003, as a compensation of Giuseppe Cardone and Christian Maggio. In summer 2004 the deal became permanent. In July 2006 he was sold to Rimini of Serie B.

In June 2010 he was hired by newly relegated Serie B team Siena, signed a 3-year contract.

In the January 2014 goes to Palermo. His contract expired by the end of the 2016–17 season, ended with Palermo being relegated to Serie B, and was not renewed.

Due to 2011 Italian football scandal, he was suspended for 4 year on 11 August 2012.

References

External links
 Profile at FIGC  
 Profile at AIC.Football.it  
 
 

Italian footballers
Italy youth international footballers
Serie A players
Serie B players
Serie C players
Parma Calcio 1913 players
A.C. Cesena players
L.R. Vicenza players
Rimini F.C. 1912 players
A.C.N. Siena 1904 players
Palermo F.C. players
Ternana Calcio players
S.S. Juve Stabia players
Association football defenders
People from Scafati
Sportspeople from the Province of Salerno
1983 births
Living people
Footballers from Campania